Bus transport in Bromsgrove has a long and varied history, dating back to Midland Red operations. In recent years, however, First Midland Red, which has evolved from the original Midland Red company, has severely reduced operations, leaving many independent operators running in the town.

Current operators

First Midland Red

First operate a single service in the town, the 144/144A route which ran to Birmingham in one direction and Worcester in the other. Service 144A terminated at Catshill instead of Birmingham. First previously operated many other services in the town, but in March 2013, the First depot's at Kidderminster and Redditch were purchased by Diamond Bus. With effect from 1st May 2022, all journeys on service 144 terminate at Catshill, no longer continuing into Birmingham. The company states that insufficient passengers are carried between Catshill and Birmingham to make the section viable.

Diamond West Midlands

Diamond operated the WCC tendered services 007 and 140/141. They have expanded through the acquisition of many local operators including Ludlows and Pete's Travel. Further expansion resulted from the acquisition of the Kidderminster and Redditch depots of First Midland Red.

Previous services
Diamond had previously operated the commercial 64 service to Birmingham from Bromsgrove and its replacement, service 144. Diamond also operated the 007 prior to Midland Rider taking it over however Diamond restarted operations on the 007 but which has since been renumbered 147 and taken over by Kevs Cars and Coaches.

MRD Travel
MRD operate a number of local services in the Bromsgrove area, mostly under contract to Worcestershire County Council. They have been operating since December 2003.

Clearway
Clearway have been operating for a number of years, and have in the past operated several school services. Now, they operate only two services in the town, 93 and 99, both running to Charford.

Previous operators

Travel West Midlands

Travel West Midlands used to operate the 145 route in the town, alongside a single journey on the 318 route. Since withdrawing from the area they have been renamed as National Express West Midlands. They last operated in the town on 28 June 2003. They returned to serving the town when they began operating new service 144A from Longbridge, partly replacing First Midland Red service 144.

Redline
Redline were a small local operator registered in School Lane, Lickey End, Bromsgrove. They operated local services 33, 92, 95, 96, 97, 98, 318, 319 and S23. A previous incarnation of the company had previously operated in Redditch on the 57 and 58 services, though the partnership broke up in 1989.

Current routes

A number of changes were made to services from August 29, 2021, which saw services 42 and 42A renumbered 52 and 52A. Service 52 runs hourly Mon-Sat, less frequently on Sundays running between Redditch and Kidderminster bus station only. Service 52A runs hourly daily connecting Bromsgrove Prince of Wales Hospital with Alexandra Hospital, Redditch Mon-Sat. (On Sundays Service 52A only runs between Redditch and Alexandra Hospital, not serving Bromsgrove).

Former routes

007 Bromsgrove - Halesowen

The 007 route was registered by Ludlows 26 January 1987, at the time only running between Halesowen and the village of Romsley. Seven years later on 31 January 1994 the route was massively extended at both ends to run between Merry Hill and Redditch Alexandra Hospital, via Halesowen, Romsley, Catshill, Bromsgrove and Redditch Town Centre. On 7 January 1997 the section of the route between Redditch town centre and Alexandra Hospital was withdrawn.

Following the purchase of Ludlows, the route passed into the hands of Diamond West Midlands. The route sparked local controversy in July 2010 when it was withdrawn, however it was quickly replaced by a new operator (Midland Rider) on a reduced timetable. From 11 January 2010 the service was extended to the Oakalls estate in Bromsgrove. and from August 2010, Diamond restarted operations on the 007 after Choice Travel/Midland Rider lost the contract.

The 007 ceased operation on 30 August 2014 and was replaced from 1 September 2014 by the new 147 route operated by First.

64 Bromsgrove - Birmingham

When First Midland Red rerouted the 144 route to serve Catshill instead of Lickey End in 2004, Diamond bus registered service 64 between Bromsgrove and Birmingham running along the old 144 route. From 12 April 2009, the 64 service was withdrawn and replaced by similar journeys on the 144, following the route of the First Midland Red service through Catshill.

92 Bromsgrove - Catshill
The 92 started life in the 90s as a route run by Redline in competition with First on the same corridor, however was withdrawn when Redine ceased trading in 1998. The number was reused in 1999 by local operator Clearway to operate a similar service using a different route, however this ceased on 6 February 2004 as it was no longer commercially viable and the council would not provide subsidy. A less frequent replacement service, 91 was in place the following day.

94 Bromsgrove - Catshill
The 94 route used to be a minibus town service operated by First Midland Red until 18 April 2004 when it was withdrawn and replaced by a re-routed 143 and 144 service,. The revised routes only covered a small fraction of the village which caused over 500 people to sign a petition calling for the route to be reinstated.

References

Transport in Worcestershire
Bus transport in England
Bromsgrove